is a former Japanese football player.

Playing career
Naito was born in Shizuoka on May 30, 1968. After graduating from Chuo University, he joined Hitachi in 1991. He played many matches as defender from first season. In 1992, he moved to new club Shimizu S-Pulse based in his local. He played as regular player and the club won the 2nd place in 1992 and 1993 J.League Cup. In 1996, he moved to Sanfrecce Hiroshima. He played as regular player and the club won the 2nd place in 1996 Emperor's Cup. In 1997, he moved to newly was promoted to J1 League club, Vissel Kobe. However his opportunity to play decreased and he retired end of 1998 season.

Club statistics

References

External links

Profile at biglobe.ne.jp

1968 births
Living people
Chuo University alumni
Association football people from Shizuoka Prefecture
Japanese footballers
Japan Soccer League players
J1 League players
Kashiwa Reysol players
Shimizu S-Pulse players
Sanfrecce Hiroshima players
Vissel Kobe players
Association football defenders